Benson Idahosa University (BIU) is a private, Christian university in Benin City, Edo State, Nigeria. Previously named Christian Faith University (CFU), it was renamed in honor of Archbishop Benson Idahosa, a Charismatic Pentecostal minister from Benin City, Nigeria, and reflects his evangelical beliefs. He was the first president of the university. The current president of Benson Idahosa University, Rt. Rev. (Dr.) Faith Emmanuel Benson Idahosa, son of Benson Idahosa, is the Bishop of CGMi Faith Arena and Co-ordinator, Next Generation Leadership of the Church of God Mission.

BIU is accredited by Nigeria's higher education accreditation body, the National Universities Commission(NUC).It is the only university in Africa with international membership with the United States National Academy of Inventors. Benson Idahosa University has maintained an enviable record in sports. BIU has maintained the best performance by any private university in Nigeria in all editions of Nigerian Private Universities Games, Nigerian Universities Games and West African Universities Games.

History
At the dedication of the multi-purpose main auditorium, the founder, Archbishop Benson Andrew Idahosa, said "in 1978, God told me I was going to build a university to the glory of his majesty... only God could have done that, as building a university in Nigeria then was the preserve of Federal and State Governments in Nigeria."

The university commenced its academic programmes as Christian Faith University-Institute of Continuous Learning in 1993 at the Ugbor Campus. Successful candidates were admitted into two faculties—Basic Sciences and Management Sciences. National diploma degrees were awarded to students on completion of a two-year programme in affiliation with University of Benin, Benin City and Edo State University, Ekpoma (now Ambrose Ali University, Edo State).

The head of management was referred to as the rector. The rector was Prof. Uche Gbenedio. With support from Mike Okagbare, the registrar, and Mr. Adams, the bursar. Candidates were admitted into programmes in Computer Science, Computer Technology, Agriculture, Accounting, Economics and Political Science.

The university was later named "Benson Idahosa University" in 1998. In the 1999/2000 academic session, BIU had three faculties—Faculty of Basic and Applied Sciences, Faculty of Social and Management Sciences and Faculty of Arts and Education.

The university received the required license to operate as a private university in Nigeria from the National Universities Commission in February, 2002.

The university's fourth faculty is the Faculty of Law, which currently has provisional accreditation from the Council of Legal Education.

In August 2015, BIU opened its second campus, popularly known as Legacy Campus, Okha, with the movement of Faculty of Agriculture and Agricultural Technologies in August 2015, and commencement of Faculty of Engineering in September 2015. Prof. Ben Anyata became the First Dean, Faculty of Engineering in February 2015.

In May 2018, Prof. Sam Guobadia, the acting Vice Chancellor, announced the commencement of a new faculty, the Faculty of Basic Medical and Health Sciences, which is proposed to house the department of Medical Lab Sciences and Nursing.

Convocation
The university had its first convocation ceremony (postgraduate diplomas and bachelor's degrees in arts and sciences) on 25 September 2004, with Prof. E.T Ehiametalor as pro-chancellor, Prof. Eghosa Osagie as vice chancellor and E.M. Obadan as registrar. The Chancellor, Archbishop Margaret Benson E. Idahosa OON, was conferred with a Doctor of Letters degree.

Alumni

Notable alumni
Among notable alumni are:
 
 
 Foluke Adeboye, author, televangelist
 Eghosa Asemota Agbonifo, entrepreneur, politician
 Blossom Chukwujekwu,  Nollywood actor
 Uti Nwachukwu, TV presenter

Association
 Benson Idahosa University alumni comprise graduates of the then Christian Faith University, which later translated into Benson Idahosa University. Alumni groups and chapters have been organized in several states with a view to carrying on the traditions of BIU and strengthening ties and communication between alumni and the university. The association has been in existence since 2004.

References

External links
Benson Idahosa University

Education in Benin City
Educational institutions established in 1998
1998 establishments in Nigeria
Benson Idahosa University
Christian universities and colleges in Nigeria